Al-Suwaira Sport Club, is an Iraqi football team based in Al-Suwaira, Wasit, that plays in Iraq Division Two.

Managerial history
  Shaban Farhan
  Nazar Marah

See also 
 2020–21 Iraq FA Cup
 2021–22 Iraq FA Cup

References

External links
 Al-Suwaira SC on Goalzz.com
 Iraq Clubs- Foundation Dates

1991 establishments in Iraq
Association football clubs established in 1991
Football clubs in Wasit